A service is an act or use for which a consumer, firm, or government is willing to pay. Examples include work done by barbers, doctors, lawyers, mechanics, banks, insurance companies, and so on. Public services are those that society (nation state, fiscal union or region) as a whole pays for. Using resources, skill, ingenuity, and experience, service providers benefit service consumers. Services may be defined as intangible acts or performances whereby the service provider provides value to the customer.

Key characteristics
Services have three key characteristics:

Intangibility
Services are by definition intangible. They are not manufactured, transported or stocked.

One cannot store services for future use. They are produced and consumed simultaneously.

Perishability

Services are perishable in two regards:
 Service-relevant resources, processes, and systems are assigned for service delivery during a specific period in time. If the service consumer does not request and consume the service during this period, the related resources may go unused. From the perspective of the service provider, this is a lost business opportunity if no other use for those resources is available. Examples: A hairdresser serves another client. An empty seat on an airplane cannot be filled after departure.
 When the service has been completely rendered to the consumer, this particular service irreversibly vanishes. Example: a passenger has been transported to the destination.
The service provider must deliver the service at the exact time of service consumption. The service is not manifested in a physical object that is independent of the provider. The service consumer is also inseparable from service delivery. Examples: The service consumer must sit in the hairdresser's chair, or in the airplane seat. Correspondingly, the hairdresser or the pilot must be in the shop or plane, respectively, to deliver the service.

Variability
Each service is unique. It can never be exactly repeated as the time, location, circumstances, conditions, current configurations and/or assigned resources are different for the next delivery, even if the same service is requested by the consumer. Many services are regarded as heterogeneous and are typically modified for each service-consumer or for each service-context. Example: The taxi service which transports the service consumer from home to work is different from the taxi service which transports the same service consumer from work to home – another point in time, the other direction, possibly another route, probably another taxi-driver and cab. Another and more common term for this is heterogeneity.

Service quality
Mass generation and delivery of services must be mastered for a service provider to expand. This can be seen as a problem of service quality. Both inputs and outputs to the processes involved providing services are highly variable, as are the relationships between these processes, making it difficult to maintain consistent service quality. Many services involve variable human activity, rather than a precisely determined process; exceptions include utilities. The human factor is often the key success factor in service provision. Demand can vary by season, time of day, business cycle, etc. Consistency is necessary to create enduring business relationships.

Specification

Any service can be clearly and completely, consistently and concisely specified by means of standard attributes that conform to the MECE principle (Mutually Exclusive, Collectively Exhaustive).

 Service consumer benefits – (set of) benefits that are triggerable, consumable and effectively utilizable for any authorized service consumer and that are rendered upon request. These benefits must be described in terms that are meaningful to consumers.
 Service-specific functional parameters – parameters that are essential to the respective service and that describe the important dimension(s) of the servicescape, the service output or the service outcome, e.g. whether the passenger sits in an aisle or window seat.
 Service delivery point – the physical location and/or logical interface where the benefits of the service are rendered to the consumer. At this point the service delivery preparation can be assessed and delivery can be monitored and controlled.
 Service consumer count – the number of consumers that are enabled to consume a service.
 Service delivery readiness time – the moments when the service is available and all the specified service elements are available at the delivery point
 Service consumer support times – the moments when the support team ("service desk") is available. The service desk is the Single Point of Contact (SPoC) for service inquiries. At those times, the service desk can be reached via commonly available communication methods (phone, web, etc.) 
 Service consumer support language – the language(s) spoken by the service desk.
 Service fulfillment target – the provider's promise to deliver the service, expressed as the ratio of the count of successful service deliveries to the count of service requests by a single consumer or consumer group over some time period.
 Service impairment duration – the maximum allowable interval between the first occurrence of a service impairment and the full resumption and completion of the service delivery.
 Service delivery duration – the maximum allowable period for effectively rendering all service benefits to the consumer.
 Service delivery unit – the scope/number of action(s) that constitute a delivered service. Serves as the reference object for the Service Delivering Price, for all service costs as well as for charging and billing.
 Service delivery price – the amount of money the customer pays to receive a service. Typically, the price includes a service access price that qualifies the consumer to request the service and a service consumption price for each delivered service.

Delivery

The delivery of a service typically involves six factors:
 Service provider (workers and managers)
 Equipment used to provide the service (e.g. vehicles, cash registers, technical systems, computer systems)
 Physical facilities (e.g. buildings, parking, waiting rooms)
 Service consumer
 Other customers at the service delivery location
 Customer contact

The service encounter is defined as all activities involved in the service delivery process. Some service managers use the term "moment of truth" to indicate that point in a service encounter where interactions are most intense.

Many business theorists view service provision as a performance or act (sometimes humorously referred to as dramalurgy, perhaps in reference to dramaturgy). The location of the service delivery is referred to as the stage and the objects that facilitate the service process are called props. A script is a sequence of behaviors followed by those involved, including the client(s). Some service dramas are tightly scripted, others are more ad lib. Role congruence occurs when each actor follows a script that harmonizes with the roles played by the other actors.

In some service industries, especially health care, dispute resolution and social services, a popular concept is the idea of the caseload, which refers to the total number of patients, clients, litigants, or claimants for which a given employee is responsible. Employees must balance the needs of each individual case against the needs of all other current cases as well as their own needs.

Under English law, if a service provider is induced to deliver services to a dishonest client by a deception, this is an offence under the Theft Act 1978.

Lovelock used the number of delivery sites (whether single or multiple) and the method of delivery to classify services in a 2 x 3 matrix. Then implications are that the convenience of receiving the service is the lowest when the customer has to come to the service and must use a single or specific outlet. Convenience increases (to a point) as the number of service points increase.

Service-commodity goods continuum

The distinction between a good and a service remains disputed. The perspective in the late-eighteenth and early-nineteenth centuries focused on creation and possession of wealth. Classical economists contended that goods were objects of value over which ownership rights could be established and exchanged. Ownership implied tangible possession of an object that had been acquired through purchase, barter or gift from the producer or previous owner and was legally identifiable as the property of the current owner.

Adam Smith’s famous book, The Wealth of Nations, published in 1776, distinguished between the outputs of what he termed "productive" and "unproductive" labor. The former, he stated, produced goods that could be stored after production and subsequently exchanged for money or other items of value. The latter, however useful or necessary, created services that perished at the time of production and therefore did not contribute to wealth. Building on this theme, French economist Jean-Baptiste Say argued that production and consumption were inseparable in services, coining the term "immaterial products" to describe them.

In the modern day, Gustofsson & Johnson describe a continuum with pure service on one terminal point and pure commodity good on the other. Most products fall between these two extremes. For example, a restaurant provides a physical good (the food), but also provides services in the form of ambience, the setting and clearing of the table, etc. And although some utilities actually deliver physical goods — like water utilities that deliver water — utilities are usually treated as services.

Service types
The following is a list of service industries, grouped into sectors. Parenthetical notations indicate how specific occupations and organizations can be regarded as service industries to the extent they provide an intangible service, as opposed to a tangible good.

 Business functions (that apply to all organizations in general)
 Consulting
 Customer service
 Human resources administrators (providing services like ensuring that employees are paid accurately)
 Cleaning, patronage, repair and maintenance services
 Gardeners
 Janitors (who provide cleaning services)
 Mechanics
 Construction
 Carpentry
 Electricians (offering the service of making wiring work properly)
 Plumbing
 Death care
 Coroners (who provide the service of identifying cadavers and determining time and cause of death)
 Funeral homes (who prepare corpses for public display, cremation or burial)
 Dispute resolution and prevention services
 Arbitration
 Courts of law (who perform the service of dispute resolution backed by the power of the state)
 Diplomacy
 Incarceration (provides the service of keeping criminals out of society)
 Law enforcement (provides the service of identifying and apprehending criminals)
 Lawyers (who perform the services of advocacy and decisionmaking in many dispute resolution and prevention processes)
 Mediation
 Military (performs the service of protecting states in disputes with other states)
 Negotiation (not really a service unless someone is negotiating on behalf of another)
 Education (institutions offering the services of teaching and access to information)
 Library
 Museum
 School
 Entertainment (when provided live or within a highly specialized facility)
 Gambling
 Movie theatres (providing the service of showing a movie on a big screen)
 Performing arts productions
 Sport
 Television
 Fabric care
 Dry cleaning
 Laundry
 Financial services
 Accountancy
 Banks and building societies (offering lending services and safekeeping of money and valuables)
 Real estate
 Stock brokerages
 Tax services
 Valuation 
 Foodservice industry
 Health care (all health care professions provide services)
 Hospitality industry
 Information services
 Database services
 Data processing
 Interpreting
 Translation
 Logistics
 Transport
 Warehousing
 Stock management
 Packaging
 Personal grooming
 Body hair removal
 Dental hygienist
 Hairdressing
 Manicurist / pedicurist
 Public utility
 Electric power
 Natural gas
 Telecommunications
 Waste management
 Water industry
 Risk management
 Insurance
 Security
 Social services
 Social work
 Childcare
 Elderly care

List of countries by tertiary output
Below is a list of countries by service output at market exchange rates in nominal terms from 2018.

See also 
 As a service
 Deliverable
 Good (economics)
 Intangible good
 List of economics topics
 Product (economics)
 Services marketing
 Universal basic services

References

Further reading 

 Athens University of Economics and Business: Introduction to Services Marketing

 Valerie Zeithaml, A. Parasumaran, Leonhard Berry (1990): SERVQUAL 
 Sharon Dobson: Product and Services Strategy
 John Swearingen: Operations Management - Characteristics of services
 James A. Fitzsimmons, Mona J. Fitzsimmons: Service Management - Operations, Strategy, Information Technology 
 Russell Wolak, Stavros Kalafatis, Patricia Harris: An Investigation Into Four Characteristics of Services 
 Sheelagh Matear, Brendan Gray, Tony Garrett, Ken Deans: Moderating Effects of Service Characteristics on the Sources of Competitive Advantage - Positional Advantage Relationship 

 Alan Pilkington, Kah Hin Chai, "Research Themes, Concepts and Relationships: A study of International Journal of Service Industry Management (1990 to 2005)," International Journal of Service Industry Management, (2008) Vol. 19, No. 1, pp. 83–110.

External links

Goods (economics)